Marsupina bufo, common name the chestnut frog shell, is a species of sea snail, a marine gastropod mollusk in the family Bursidae, the frog shells.

Distribution
This species is distributed in the Gulf of Mexico, the Caribbean Sea and the Lesser Antilles; in the Atlantic Ocean from North Carolina to Northern Brazil.

Description 
The shell size varies between 20 mm and 75 mm.

The maximum recorded shell length is 60 mm.

Habitat 
Minimum recorded depth is 0 m. Maximum recorded depth is 100 m.

References

Further reading 
 Dautzenberg, P. (1923). Liste preliminaire des mollusques marins de Madagascar et description de deux especes nouvelles. Journal de Conchyliologie 68: 21–74.
 Rosenberg, G., F. Moretzsohn, and E. F. García. 2009. Gastropoda (Mollusca) of the Gulf of Mexico, Pp. 579–699 in Felder, D.L. and D.K. Camp (eds.), Gulf of Mexico–Origins, Waters, and Biota. Biodiversity. Texas A&M Press, College Station, Texas

External links
 

Bursidae
Gastropods described in 1792